Rosporden is a commune in the Finistère department of Brittany in north-western France. Rosporden station has rail connections to Quimper, Lorient and Vannes.

The small city specializes in the manufacture of "chouchen", a version of mead native to Brittany, and is known as the Capital of Chouchen.

Population
Inhabitants of Rosporden are called in French Rospordinois. In 1974 Rosporden absorbed the former commune of Kernével. The population data given in the table below for 1968 and earlier refer to the former commune of Rosporden, without Kernével.

See also
Communes of the Finistère department

References

External links

Official website 

Mayors of Finistère Association 

Communes of Finistère